Thalolam is a 1998 Indian Malayalam-language drama film directed by Jayaraj, starring Suresh Gopi and Murali in the lead roles.

Plot
Shankarunni, a violinist, and his wife Devu are mourning the loss of their daughter. Shankarunni's guru, a renowned singer and surrogate father, asks him to air out his troubles after a mistake-ridden violin performance from Shankarunni.

The violinist relates how his house was like heaven with him and his wife lovingly raising their daughter and the daughter of his foster brother Haridas. Haridas, whose wife died after their daughter's birth, left his daughter at the care of Shankarunni and Devu to pursue his and his late wife's dream of a career in Paris.

Shankarunni reveals to his teacher that it was Haridas's daughter who was dead, and from guilt they said it was their daughter who died. His teacher gives him the strength through wisdom to finally settle in enjoying his life with the decision and taking care of the young girl of his house. However, years later Haridas comes back for his daughter and the secrets hidden long ago threaten to rear its head.

Cast
 Suresh Gopi as Chittor Haridas
 Murali as Chittoor Sankaran Unni
 Sreelakshmi as Devu
 Rehana Navas as Seetha
 Bharath Gopi as Tathamangalam Swamy

Soundtrack 
The film's soundtrack contains 9 songs, all composed by Kaithapram Damodaran Namboothiri. Lyrics were by Kaithapram and P. G. Sasi.

References

External links

1998 films
1990s Malayalam-language films
Films scored by Kaithapram Damodaran Namboothiri